David Russell Batiste Jr. (born December 12, 1965) is an American drummer based in New Orleans.

Biography 
Brought up in a musical family, Batiste started playing drums at the age of four. He also learned to play keyboards, saxophone, guitar and bass, and started to play in the family band when he was seven.

Batiste left college after two years to join Charmaine Neville's band. He joined the funky Meters, the reincarnation of the funk band The Meters, in 1989. The funky Meters without Art Neville currently plays under the name Porter Batiste Stoltz (PBS). (with George Porter Jr. on bass, and Brian Stoltz on guitar)

As a solo artist, he leads his own band Russell Batiste Jr. and the Orkestra from 'Da Hood and has released two albums under the name.

Batiste also plays regularly with organ player Joe Krown and guitarist Walter "Wolfman" Washington as the Krown Washington Batiste trio. This unit released a live CD Live at the Maple Leaf in 2008.

Batiste has performed with wide range of musicians and bands including Papa Grows Funk, Vida Blue, Harry Connick Jr., Champion Jack Dupree, Robbie Robertson and Maceo Parker. In 1987 Batiste was in the New Orleans funk band Nuclear Rhythms featuring percussionist songwriter Rosie Rosato, psychedelic funk guitarist songwriter  Dirk Billie , bassist songwriter Mark Adam Miller and guitar and keyboard player David M. Brown.

Discography

Solo works 
 2000 Orkestra from 'Da Hood (Russell Batiste Jr.)
 2003 The Clinic (Russell Batiste Jr.)

With The Funky Meters 
 2003 Fiyo at the Fillmore, Vol. 1 (Fuel 2000)

With Vida Blue 
 2002 Vida Blue (Elektra)
 2003 The Illustrated Band (Sanctuary)
 2019 Crossing Lines (ATO Records)

With Porter Batiste Stoltz 
 2005 Expanding The Funkin' Universe (Ouw)
 2008 Moodoo (High Steppin' Productions)

With Krown Washington Batiste
 2008 Live at the Maple Leaf (Independent)
 2010 Triple Threat (Independent)
 2013 Soul Understanding (Independent)

References

External links
 The funky Meters official website
 Porter Batiste Stolz official website

1965 births
Living people
African-American drummers
American funk drummers
American male drummers
Rhythm and blues musicians from New Orleans
20th-century American drummers
20th-century American male musicians
20th-century African-American musicians
21st-century African-American people